Lanthanum stearate is a metal-organic compound, a salt of lanthanum and stearic acid with the chemical formula . The compound is classified as a metallic soap, i.e. a metal derivative of a fatty acid.

Physical properties
The compound forms white powder.

Soluble in benzene.

Uses
Lanthanum stearate is mainly used as a nucleating agent for plastics degradation and heat stabilizer for PVC.

References

Stearates
Lanthanum compounds